The Atlantic Book Awards & Festival is an annual event celebrating Atlantic Canadian writing and book illustration. Free events take place across the four Atlantic provinces (Newfoundland & Labrador, Prince Edward Island, New Brunswick, and Nova Scotia). The flagship event is the awards ceremony itself at which 13 different literary awards are presented.

Awards
Thomas Head Raddall Award - fiction
J. M. Abraham Poetry Award - poetry
Ann Connor Brimer Award - children's literature
Alistair MacLeod Prize - short fiction
Atlantic Book Award for Scholarly Writing
Atlantic Publishers Marketing Association’s Best Atlantic-Published Book Award
Democracy 250 Atlantic Book Award for Historical Writing
Evelyn Richardson Award for Non-Fiction
Jim Connors Dartmouth Book Award - fiction
Robbie Robertson Dartmouth Book Award - non-fiction
Lillian Shepherd Award for Excellence in Illustration
Margaret and John Savage First Book Award, Fiction
Margaret and John Savage First Book Award, Non-Fiction

References

External links
 Official website

Literary festivals in Canada
Awards established in 2009

Arts festivals in New Brunswick
Arts festivals in Newfoundland and Labrador
Arts festivals in Nova Scotia
Arts festivals in Prince Edward Island
Culture of Atlantic Canada